Invicta Grammar School is a grammar school with academy status in Maidstone, Kent, England. The school caters for girls between the ages 11 to 16, with a coeducational sixth form.

Previous names
The school has previously been known as Maidstone School for Girls, and Maidstone Technical High School for Girls before that.

Specialist status and awards
Invicta became a specialist Business and Enterprise College in September 2003. The school received an achievement award from the Department for Education and Skills in 2000, 2001 and 2002. It also has the Artsmark Gold and Sportsmark awards.

GCSE results 
20182019:
62.23% of Students achieved 9-7 grade or A*-A in further maths

A Level results 
20182019:
10.14% A* grades, 51.39% A-B grades and 37.97 C-E grades were awarded to pupils

Buildings
Invicta comprises several buildings. The reception is housed in the Main Building, which links to the dining hall, assembly hall and most form rooms. There is a drama studio as well as a gym. The Main Building links into the Extension Building which includes an art studio and technology workshops. The site also includes the Albion Building, hosting a range of subjects including languages, science and textiles. The Orchard Building opened in 2005 and primarily houses the English department and the Orchard Library (commonly known as the Resources Centre). The Izatt Building was opened in 2014 and the English department was based there together with a dance studio and reading room. It is now used for maths.

Student houses
Student houses were introduced in 2010, named after notable women. The houses are named: Austen, Bronte, Curie, Frank, Nightingale, Pankhurst, Roddick and Colvin.

References

Grammar schools in Kent
Girls' schools in Kent
Academies in Kent